Madhukar Dhumal is an Indian Shehnai Player, Composer and freelance Musician.
He is a disciple of Guni Gandharva Pandit Laxmanprasad Jaipurwale and Pandit Rajaram Sukhla.He is part of many other bands and has performed with various artists around the world. Majorly performed for Bollywood industry with all known Music directors.

Early life

Shri. Madhukar Tukaram Dhumal was born to Late. Tukaram and Chandrabai Dhumal born in Satara, Maharashtra. Both his parents were musicians. He started learning Shehnai at an early age from his father.

Career

Shri. Madhukar Dhumal is a promising and talented Shehnai player, who is the son & disciple of the eminent Shehnai player late Shri Tukaramji Dhumal. After the Initial period of learning and training from his father, Shri Madhukar attained proficiency in the Hindustani Classical Music, Ragdhari style of Jaipur Gharana as well as Banaras Gharana and its nuances under intensive and able teachings from the great maestro Guni Gandharava Pandit Laxmanprasad Jaipurwale and Pandit Rajaram Shukla, the gifted Guru, Composer and performer of great virtuosity.

Shri. Madhukar with arduous training and dedicated perseverance has mastered in both Khayal Gayaki and Tatkari and equally well under the tutelage of the great maestros of Hindustani Classical Music, cited above.

Shri Madhukar's renditions in many music concerts of repute throughout the country have received accolades and appreciations from the connoisseurs to the lay music lovers, media and the press, unfailingly time and again.

Shri Madhukar is a graded artist (B-high) of All India Radio and his renditions are regularly broadcast by AIR and doordarshan.
He has rendered Music for many Eminent music directors of the film, industry, T.V. serials etc. His performances are aired by channels like Sony Entertainment Television and others.

Shri Madhukar is a gifted, talented and promising Shehnai player with an enchanting and mesmerising music in his Shehnai renditions. Shri Madhukar has the potential to captivate music lovers and connoisseurs for years to come with great milestones and soul stirring evocative music full of melody, aesthetics and pure music.

He has played for many Bollywood movies with well known Music Directors like Laxmikant–Pyarelal for Saudagar 1991, Rajesh Roshan for Koyla, A.R.Rahman for Swades, Lagaan, Ismail Darbar for Devdas, Hum Dil De Chuke Sanam, M. M. Keeravani for Paheli, Anu Malik for Refugee, Amit Trivedi for Dev D, Ram Sampath for Fukrey, pritam chakraborty for Action Replayy.

Personal life

Madhukar Dhumal is married to Nisha Dhumal and currently lives with his daughter and son in Mumbai.

Performances
66th Sawai Gandharva Bhimsen Festival 2017.
61st Sawai Gandharva Bhimsen Festival in 2013 (Pune) opening rendition of concert.
Sangeet Samrat Ustad Alladiya Khan Saheb Mohatsav 2013 Murham SangeetRatna AbdulKarim Khan Saheb 79 th Punyatithi Samaroh.
At Bandish a concert organised in memory of tabla nawaz late Ustad Amir Hussain KhanSaheb in Mumbai.
At Gurupurnima celebration (2003) at the Taj in Mumbai 24' Ragas - 24 hrs' concert under aegis of Acharya Jialal Vasant Sangeet Niketan, Juhu and Times Foundation.
At NCPA - Mumbai for the concert organised by H.A Trust.
At the '50 hrs, Non - Stop' Indian Classical Music concert (Swarankur) with the inaugural and opening rendition of the concert.
At cultural events organised by Government of Maharashtra at various places on days of national importance and at important inaugural functions.

Discography

 1998 Parinay Shekhar Sen 
 1998 Ok Talvin Singh
 1999 Divinity - Divine Music for Meditation Ashit Desai  
 2000 Indian Beyond Remo Fernandes
 2000 Rimayer Ziskakan 
 2001 African Fantasy Trilok Gurtu 
 2001 Trinity - Music of Gods Ashit Desai
 2002 Bombay Bliss -  A Unique Instrumental Music Experience of Ever-green Melodies Ashit Desai
 2003 Heeyam Shye Ben Tzur
 2013 Alchemy (EP) Bandish Projekt

References

http://sawaigandharvabhimsenmahotsav.com/
https://plus.google.com/u/0/108773971830575647848/posts
http://cinema.pluz.in/galleries/bollywood/71842/61th-sawai-gandharva-bhimsen-mahotsav-day-1-photos.htm
http://www.discogs.com/artist/595455-Madhukar-T-Dhumal
http://indianexpress.com/tag/madhukar-dhumal/
https://archive.today/20140419163015/http://www.thepunekar.com/highlights-of-sawai-2013/2013/12/madhukar-dhumal/
http://mobiletoi.timesofindia.com/mobile.aspx?article=yes&pageid=2&sectid=edid=&edlabel=TOIPU&mydateHid=13-12-2013&pubname=Times+of+India+-+Pune&edname=&articleid=Ar00200&publabel=TOI

1960 births
Living people